The 2013 Girls' EuroHockey Youth Championships was the 7th edition of the Girls' EuroHockey Youth Championship. The tournament was held from 29 July–4 August 2013 in Dublin, Ireland at the University College Dublin.

Netherlands won the tournament for the fifth time after defeating Germany 1–0 in the final.

Qualified teams
The following teams participated in the 2015 EuroHockey Youth Championship:

Format
The eight teams were split into two groups of four teams. The top two teams advanced to the semifinals to determine the winner in a knockout system. The bottom two teams played in a new group with the teams they did not play against in the group stage. The bottom two teams were relegated to the EuroHockey Youth Championship II.

Results

Preliminary round

Pool A

Pool B

Classification round

Fifth to eighth place classification
Points from the preliminary round were carried over to Pool C to determine group standings.

Pool C

First to fourth place classification

Semi-finals

Third and fourth place

Final

References

External links
European Hockey Federation

Girls' EuroHockey Youth Championships
Youth
EuroHockey Youth Championships
EuroHockey Youth Championships
EuroHockey Youth Championships
International women's field hockey competitions hosted by Ireland
EuroHockey Youth Championships
EuroHockey Youth Championships